Christian Frederik von Schalburg (15 April 1906 – 2 June 1942) was a Danish army officer, the second commander of Free Corps Denmark and brother of Vera Schalburg.

Biography
Christian Frederik von Schalburg was born in Zmeinogorsk, Tomskaja Gubernija, Russian Empire (now Altai Krai, Russia) as the oldest of three children to August Theodor von Schalburg and wife Helene von Schalburg. His father was born 1879 in Nyborg, Denmark  and his mother Elena Vasiljevna née Starizki von Siemianowska was born 1882 in Ukraine (possibly Poltava) out of a Russian noble family. Still a boy von Schalburg received a military education in the Tsar's cadet corps and lived in Russia until the October Revolution of 1917 when he fled with his family to Denmark. These dramatic events caused him to long for Russia and to hate communists.

In 1920 the young von Schalburg moved with his family from Hellerup to Vibevej 14, Copenhagen, and in 1922 the family moved to Borups Allé 4, from where he left home.

On 21 November 1927 in the Alexander Nevsky Church, Copenhagen he was best man for the ten year older first lieutenant Grigorij Nikolaevitch Stschrikin, as Konstantin Fedorovitch Schalburg.

In 1927 in Copenhagen he was deemed unfit for military service.

Nevertheless, on 18 October 1929 he was married in the Alexander Nevsky Church as bachelor, Danish subject, lieutenant Konstantin Fedorovitch Schalburg residing Trestjernegade 4 on Amager. His bride was the four years younger, German born, unmarried Baroness Helga Frederikke von Bülow. In 1930 he registered a telephone as a first lieutenant residing Trestjernegade 4 on Amager.

On 22 November 1934 his wife gave birth to their son who was baptized Aleksander Schalburg on 2 February 1935 in the Alexander Nevsky Church, Copenhagen. The father was registered as first lieutenant in the Royal Danish Life Guards Konstantin Schalburg, residing Store Kongensgade 114, while the godparents were His Royal Highness Prince Gustav of Denmark, colonel Nikolai Kulikovsky and his spouse Grand Duchess Olga Alexandrovna of Russia.

On 12 July 1935 in the Alexander Nevsky Church he was best man for a bride couple from Stockholm, as Konstantin Fedorovitch Schalburg.

In 1935 he served as first lieutenant in the Royal Danish Life Guards while residing in Store Kongensgade 114 and from the following year he used the title Valet de chambre (Kammerjunker).

From 1937 (and until his death) he kept his phone registered as a captain in Royal Danish Life Guards and valet de chambre.

In the Royal Danish Life Guards he was eventually described as 'unstable and for the army possibly a dangerous man'. In a letter to the king he defended himself as a victim of Jewish slander.

From 1939 von Schalburg headed the youth branch (NSU) of the National Socialist Workers' Party of Denmark (DNSAP), where he became very popular. That same year he and a group of NSU members called '' (the blood boys) were among the Danish volunteers for the Finnish Winter War against the USSR in 1939–1940. He was thus abroad when Denmark was occupied by Nazi Germany on 9 April 1940. Despite his Nazi beliefs he was deeply distressed that Denmark had surrendered almost without fighting.

In September 1940 with the consent of the Danish army and the king, von Schalburg joined the Waffen-SS and served with 5th SS Division Wiking as a SS-Hauptsturmführer.

In the November 1940 Danish census he is an off duty Kaptajnløjtnant of the Royal Danish Life Guards, still in Belgium and thus absent from his residence at Brøndsted Allé, Frederiksberg where his wife and teenage son lives.

In February 1941 von Schalburg suggested to his friend, head of DNSAP Frits Clausen, the formation of a Danish SS unit, 'Regiment Dannebrog', to be commanded by himself.

During Operation Barbarossa von Schalburg served on the divisional staff of Division Wiking. He was awarded the Iron Cross of 1st and 2nd class while serving in Division Wiking.

On 27 February 1942 von Schalburg arrived at Frikorps Danmark in Treskau and on March 1 he was given command of the corps, now ranked SS-Sturmbannführer (Major).

The SS gave von Schalburg this command mostly because of his political reliability and willingness to provide his corps with the required ideological training and also because he enjoyed good relations with his subordinates, all qualities that his predecessor C.P. Kryssing lacked.

As part of his responsibility for the unit's training, he introduced lessons in German and Russian, a 1/2 hour of PE every morning and extended duty hours from 5 (05:00) to 20 (20:00).

On 8 May 1942 von Schalburg was flown by Junkers Ju 52 with parts of the corps into the Demyansk Pocket.

On 2 June 1942 von Schalburg initiated the first offensive operation of Frikorps Danmark. In an attempt to monitor the progress of the battle, von Schalburg advanced towards the front line, but stepped on a mine and was moments later killed by shrapnel from a Russian artillery shell. The subsequent rescue of his corpse, which caused a casualty, revealed extensive injuries including a leg torn off at the hip and a missing foot.

Legacy

On 3 June 1942, von Schalburg's body was transported in a coffin draped in Dannebrog to the cemetery of the corps located in the small village Biakovo in the Demjansk area. The commanding officer of the 3rd SS Division Totenkopf SS-Brigadeführer Hellmuth Becker spoke at the funeral.

On the same day, Reichsführer-SS Heinrich Himmler posthumously promoted von Schalburg to SS-Obersturmbannführer, effective from 1 June.

In Denmark, the newspaper of the DNSAP 'Fædrelandet' (the Fatherland) filled the front page with the news of the fallen commander, and a memorial service for von Schalburg was disrupted by protests shouted by a student. The poet Valdemar Rørdam who had already gotten himself into public scandal with a poem praising Hitler, further alienated himself from the Danish public when he published a tribute to Schalburg.

A Danish medal, the Schalburg Cross and the Danish Germanic-SS Schalburg Corps, was named after von Schalburg. His widow called herself Valet de chambre (Kammerjunkerinde) Helle von Schalburg and founded Schalburgs mindefond (memorial fund), which sent packages to Danish SS volunteers on the Eastern Front.

On the second anniversary of von Schalburg's death commander of the Schalburg Corps K. B. Martinsen inaugurated a memorial for fallen, Danish members of the SS. Following the liberation the memorial was destroyed.

The fact that von Schalburg advanced, against the advice of a company commander, towards the front line and jeopardized not only his own life but also those of his corps made him a reckless commander in some eyes. However, his record indicates that he was a competent commander and in the SS, that behaviour was not uncommon, and the losses of commanders were exceptionally high, including von Schalburg's successor, who fell just two days after arriving at the corps.

References

External links
 Webpage about Christian Frederik von Schalburg

1906 births
1942 deaths
SS-Obersturmbannführer
Danish military personnel
Waffen-SS personnel killed in action
Danish anti-communists
Danish Nazis
Danish collaborators with Nazi Germany
Danish people of Russian descent
Recipients of the Iron Cross (1939), 1st class
Recipients of the Iron Cross (1939), 2nd class
Danish Waffen-SS personnel
White Russian emigrants to Denmark
Emigrants from the Russian Empire to Denmark